Francisco Aguilar may refer to:
Francisco Aguilar y Leal (1776–1849), Spanish soldier
Francisco Aguilar Barquero (1857–1924), Costa Rican president
Francisco Aguilar (footballer, born 1949), Spanish footballer
Francisco Aguilar (footballer, born 1952), Spanish footballer